Ünal Erkan (born 1942 in Erzurum) is a Nationalist Movement Party (MHP) politician. He was a member of the party's Central Executive Board, resigning in 2007. He was governor of the OHAL state-of-emergency region from 1992 to 1995, and had previously been head of police in Ankara and Istanbul and Chief of the General Directorate of Security (July 1991 to February 1992). He was briefly a cabinet minister in 1996 under Mesut Yılmaz for the True Path Party (DYP).

Erkan featured in Mehmet Eymür's controversial 1987 MIT Report that wrote about high-ranking civil servants and politicians such as Nevzat Ayaz, Erkan and Mehmet Ağar, alleging connections with the Turkish mafia.

References 

1942 births
People from Erzurum
Living people
Nationalist Movement Party politicians
Democrat Party (Turkey, current) politicians
Deputies of Ankara
Turkish police chiefs
Government ministers of Turkey
Turkish civil servants
Members of the 20th Parliament of Turkey